Phazaca is a genus of moths in the family Uraniidae first described by Walker in 1863.

Description
Palpi upturned, reaching vertex of head. Antennae thickened and flattened in male. Forewings broad. The outer margin evenly curved. Vein 5 from below the upper angle of cell and veins 6,7 and 8,9 stalked. vein 10 from cell. Hindwings usually with the outer margin produced to points at veins 4 and 7, slightly developed in male. Vein 5 from the middle of discocellulars. Veins 6 and 7 from angle of cell or shortly stalked. Male with a fold on inner area containing a tuft of long hair, veins 1b and 2 being distorted. Wings held more or less apart in repose.

Species
Phazaca acutilinea (Warren, 1897)
Phazaca alikangensis (Strand, 1917)
Phazaca cesena (Swinhoe, 1902)
Phazaca cesenaleuca Holloway, 1998
Phazaca conifera (Moore, 1887)
Phazaca coniferoides Holloway, 1998
Phazaca cyclocrossa (Turner, 1926)
Phazaca cythera (Swinhoe, 1902)
Phazaca decorata (Warren, 1898)
Phazaca erosioides Walker, 1863
Phazaca interrupta (Warren, 1896)
Phazaca kellersi Tams, 1935 (from Samoa)
Phazaca leucocephala (Walker, 1863)
Phazaca leucocera (Hampson, 1891)
Phazaca lugens (Warren, 1897)
Phazaca monticesena Holloway, 1998
Phazaca mutans (Butler, 1887)
Phazaca perfallax (Warren, 1898)
Phazaca planimargo (Warren, 1906)
Phazaca rhombifera (Warren, 1897)
Phazaca stolida (Butler, 1886)
Phazaca theclata (Guenée, 1857)
Phazaca unicauda (Dudgeon, 1905)
Phazaca unicaudoides Holloway, 1998

References

Uraniidae